Germano Luís de Figueiredo (23 December 1932 – 14 July 2004), simply known as Germano, was a Portuguese footballer who played as a central defender.

He played most of his professional career with Benfica, appearing in 131 official matches and winning eight major titles, including two European Cups. A fiercely hard-working and strong-tackling defender, he is noted for his towering presence in Benfica's back-three defending formation, alongside left-back Ângelo and right-back Mário João.

Germano represented Portugal at the 1966 World Cup. He ranked 53rd in UEFA's 50 Greatest Footballers of the Last 50 Years jubilee list.

Club career
Born in Alcântara (Lisbon), Germano started playing with local Atlético Clube de Portugal, spending seven of his nine seasons in the Primeira Liga. In the summer of 1960 he moved to neighbouring S.L. Benfica, where he remained the following six years, being a leading defensive unit of the sides that won four national championships and two European Cups (against FC Barcelona and Real Madrid); in the latter competition's 1964–65 edition, he was placed in goal following his teammate's Alberto da Costa Pereira injury in the final against Inter Milan, and kept a clean sheet for more than 30 minutes, albeit in a 0–1 loss.

Germano retired in 1967, after one year with S.C. Salgueiros of the second division. He died in Linda-a-Velha, at the age of 71.

International career
Germano won 24 caps for Portugal, over 13 years. He was part of the squad that appeared at the 1966 FIFA World Cup but, after a subpar performance in the second game against Bulgaria, was benched for the rest of the tournament, which ended with a third-place conquest.

Honours

Club
Benfica
Primeira Liga: 1960–61, 1962–63, 1963–64, 1964–65
Taça de Portugal: 1961–62, 1963–64
Taça de Honra (2)
European Cup: 1960–61, 1961–62

Atlético
Segunda Liga: 1958–59

International
Portugal
FIFA World Cup third place: 1966

Individual
World Soccer World XI: 1961, 1962, 1965

References

External links

1932 births
2004 deaths
Footballers from Lisbon
Portuguese footballers
Association football defenders
Primeira Liga players
Liga Portugal 2 players
Atlético Clube de Portugal players
S.L. Benfica footballers
S.C. Salgueiros players
UEFA Champions League winning players
Portugal international footballers
1966 FIFA World Cup players